Boba liberal is a term mostly used within the Asian diaspora communities in the West, especially in the United States. It describes someone of East or Southeast Asian descent living in the West who has an apparent liberal or centrist outlook. It is also occasionally used to describe conservatives who weaponize their East or Southeast Asian identity. The neologism emerged among Asian American communists who accused "boba liberals" of only holding their liberal beliefs to appear more white adjacent, by engaging in progressive social movements or viewpoints, while at the same time disregarding and trivializing issues concerning Asians.

Definition
The term "boba liberal" was coined by Vietnamese American communist Twitter user, @diaspoa_red. It refers to Asians who would often use their "Asianness" to speak on behalf of the Asian population in the West, using talking points often parroting white liberals, which has been decried as minimizing actual issues faced by the Asian diaspora.

The Asian identity of boba liberals has often been accused of being shallow and superficial since it goes directly against their goal of aspiring to whiteness, and so uses surface level stereotypical Asian traits such as "liking boba tea" to bolster their Asian credentials. Hence, the emergence of the term boba liberal.

United States
Specifically in the United States, it is said that boba liberals often use boba tea as it does not require much personal investment; it is a fairly popular drink in Asia and therefore a safe non-opinion to take and identify with, unlike contentious or serious topics such as bipartisan policies that specifically affect Asians, such as the Asian quota in American universities and colleges. Therefore, while the word "liberal" is used in the term, it is not mutually exclusive to one specific ideology, as it may also extend to conservative-aligned Asians in some areas, as they would often take advantage of the "model minority" label by defending such measures.

See also

Acting white
Baizuo
Banana, Coconut, and Twinkie
Cultural cringe
Crab mentality
Inferiority complex
Internalized oppression
Internalized racism
Hanjian
Limousine liberal
Model minority
Orientalism
Postcolonialism
Self-hatred
Self-hating Jew
Tall poppy syndrome
Race traitor
Takfir
Uncle Tom syndrome
Milk Tea Alliance
Jeff Yang

References

Further reading

External links
Why I Hate Subtle Asian Traits by Sarah Mae Dizon (30 August 2020).

Asian-American culture
Asian-American history
Asian-American issues
Asian-American-related controversies
Asian Australian
Canadian people of Asian descent
Cultural studies
Cultural assimilation
Liberalism in the United States
Political neologisms
Politics and race in the United States
2010s neologisms
Social inequality
Social media